Masr El-Nahrda or Masr El-Naharda...Benehlam li Bokra (Egypt today...We Dream of Tomorrow) is a live television talk show aired on ERTU and based in Cairo, Egypt. The show descended from the now defunct El beit beitak/el beet beetak show.

External links
 Official website

Egyptian television talk shows
Mass media in Cairo
Egyptian Radio and Television Union original programming